Vietnam Inland Waterways Administration (VIWA, Vietnamese: Cục Đường thuỷ nội địa Việt Nam) is the government agency of the Ministry of Transport that governs and maintains the ports, rivers, canals and navigable lakes of Vietnam.  The current General Director is Assistant Professor D.,  People's Teacher
Trần Đắc Sửu; VIWA is located in Ha Noi.

As an organization, VIWA has:
 A board of directors;
 15 River Management stations and joint stock companies;
 4 Port authorities;
 3 Training schools;
 Inspection groups;
 A magazine - Sail Magazine;
 A project management unit.

River management
VIWA has jurisdiction of over 6,000 km of riverways, operating 15 stations and over 140 substations throughout the country.  VIWA maintains over 14,000 navigation aids on Vietnam's rivers.  Principal riverways under VIWA's purview include the Red River / Thái Bình Province area in the north, and the Mekong River system in the south.

Ports

River ports
VIWA governs 77 ports in Vietnam, including 33 river ports.  It manages five of them, all in the north: Hai Phong, Ninh Bình, Bắc Ninh, Việt Trì and Hòa Bình.

Seaports
VIWA currently maintains port authorities for four seaports:
Port Authority 1 at Hai Phong
Port Authority 2 at Hanoi
Port Authority 3 at Ho Chi Minh City
Port Authority 4 at Cần Thơ

Training schools
VIWA operates three vocational schools:
Inland Waterway School 1 at Nam Dong Village, in Nam Sách District of Hải Dương Province
Inland Waterway School 2 at Ho Chi Minh City
Inland Waterway Technical Worker School at Hai Phong

See also
Inland waterway
Transport in Vietnam
Port authority
Port operator

References

External links
 Vietnam Inland Waterways Administration
 Ministry of Transport
 ASEAN Ports, Ports of Vietnam

Government agencies of Vietnam
Governmental office in Hanoi
Mekong Delta
Port authorities
Ports and harbours of Vietnam
Hong River Delta
 
Water transport in Vietnam
Inland waterway authorities
Transport organizations based in Vietnam